Yunus Emre: Aşkın Yolculuğu is a Turkish historical drama television series created by Mehmet Bozdağ, starring Yusuf Gökhan Atalay as the leading role. It premiered on TRT 1 in Turkey on June 18, 2015. It centers around the life of Yunus Emre, the 13th century Anatolian Sufi poet, who greatly influenced Anatolian culture.

Plot
In 13th century Anatolia, as Mongol invasions got more frequent, Yunus Emre travels to Nallihan where he establishes himself as a Seljuk official. After joining Taptuk Emre's dergâh (dervish monastery), he proceeds to follow his journey to become a dervish.

Cast and characters

Seasons

International broadcasting

Production 
The series is written and produced by Mehmet Bozdağ and Mustafa Tatçi, it is directed by Emre Konuk and Kamil Aydin. The theme music was produced by Zeynep Alasya, Alpay Göltekin and Caner Özkan. It has aired since June 18, 2015 on TRT 1.

Reception 
The series received critical acclaim in Turkey and was a success. In Pakistan, the Prime Minister of Pakistan, Imran Khan urged Pakistani people to watch the movie if they are interested in Sufism. The show was then dubbed in Urdu and was aired on PTV Home and was well-received by Pakistani people.

See also
 List of Islamic films
Diriliş: Ertuğrul
Kuruluş: Osman

References

External links
 

2014 Turkish television series debuts
Television series about Islam
Television series set in the 13th century
Turkish historical television series